The smoking age is the minimum legal age required to purchase or use tobacco products. Most countries have laws that forbid sale of tobacco products to persons younger than certain ages, usually the age of majority.

This article does not discuss laws that regulate electronic cigarettes.

Laws by region

Africa

Americas

Asia

Europe

Oceania

Historical regulations

Cannabis age 

Since 2012, various jurisdictions throughout the world have legalized cannabis for recreational use. In Mexico, Uruguay and cannabis-legal jurisdictions in the United States, the legal age to possess or purchase cannabis is identical to the tobacco purchase age (18 in Mexico and Uruguay and 21 in the United States). In Canada, the legal age to possess or purchase cannabis is 19 in all provinces and territories except Alberta (18) and Quebec (21). There are therefore three Canadian provinces (Manitoba, Quebec and Saskatchewan) and two territories (the Northwest Territories and Yukon) where the age to purchase tobacco is lower than the age to possess and purchase cannabis, and one province (Prince Edward Island) where the tobacco purchase age is higher. Prior to December 2019, when the United States raised its tobacco purchase age to 21 in all states and territories, several U.S. states had tobacco purchase ages lower than their cannabis possession and purchase ages.

See also 

 Age of candidacy
 Legal drinking age
 Legality of cannabis
 List of smoking bans
 Mature minor doctrine
 National Youth Rights Association
 Youth rights
 Youth suffrage

References 

Age
Juvenile law
Law-related lists
Lists by country
Minimum ages